Oxygrylius is a genus of rhinoceros beetles in the family Scarabaeidae. There are at least two described species in Oxygrylius.

Species
These two species belong to the genus Oxygrylius:
 Oxygrylius peninsularis Casey, 1915
 Oxygrylius ruginasus (LeConte, 1856)

References

Further reading

 
 
 
 

Dynastinae
Articles created by Qbugbot